Michail Elgin and Alexandre Kudryavtsev are the defending champions but lost in the first round.
Dustin Brown and Lovro Zovko won the title, defeating Philipp Petzschner and Alexander Waske 6–4, 7–6(7–4) in the final.

Seeds

Draw

Draw

References
 Main Draw

Internazionali Tennis Val Gardena Sudtirol - Doubles
Internazionali Tennis Val Gardena Südtirol